Ecnomiohyla salvaje is a species of frog in the family Hylidae.
It is found in Guatemala and Honduras.
Its natural habitats are subtropical or tropical moist montane forests and heavily degraded former forest.
It is threatened by habitat loss.

References

S
Amphibians of Guatemala
Amphibians of Honduras
Frogs of North America
Critically endangered fauna of North America
Amphibians described in 1985
Taxonomy articles created by Polbot